The Kenyan big-eared free-tailed bat (Tadarida lobata) is a species of bat in the family Molossidae. It is found in Kenya and Zimbabwe. Its natural habitat is dry savanna.

References

Tadarida
Taxonomy articles created by Polbot
Mammals described in 1891
Taxa named by Oldfield Thomas
Bats of Africa